Skin and Bones is the debut album by Flashy Python. It appeared without any pre-release press on the band's official website, from where it is available for streaming, high-quality mp3 download, and purchase in physical form on CD or Vinyl.

Track listing

All tracks written by Alec Ounsworth.

"Let Us Hallucinate Together" - 3:21
"The Lady is a Ghost" - 5:31
"Ichiban Blues" - 3:30
"Skin and Bones" - 4:31
"Obscene Queen Bee" - 4:33
"In the Darkness" - 4:53
"Cattle's New Clothes" - 3:47
"Avalon's Snake Breath" - 11:12
"King Sutt" - 1:21 (Japanese edition bonus track)
"Me and the Wife" - 4:01 (Japanese edition bonus track, alternate version of 'That is Not My Home (After Bruegel)' from Mo Beauty)
"All and All" - 5:03 (Japanese edition bonus track)

Personnel 

Alec Ounsworth - Vocals, Hammond Organ, Wurlitzer, Bass Guitar, Piano, Guitar, Percussion, Gong, Mud Guitar, Air Organs, Throat Tom, Accordion, Harmonica, 12-string Guitar, Farfisa, Acoustic Guitar, Mud Vocals, Motu Strings (Violin, Cello, Contrabass)
Scott McMicken - Guitar, Piano, Drums, Hammond Organ, Percussion, Bass Guitar, Wurlitzer
Matt Sutton - Baritone Guitar, Pedal-steel Guitar, Acoustic Baritone Guitar
Quentin Stoltzfus – Bongos, Drums, Guitar
Mickey Walker – Bass Guitar, Farifsa
Matt Barrick - Drums
Toby Leaman - Bass guitar
Billy Dufala - Saxophone
David Cope – Piano
Tyler Sargent - Bass Guitar
Emily Ounsworth - Trumpet

References

2009 debut albums